Seo-yun, also spelled Seo-yoon, Suh-yoon, or Suh-yun, is a South Korean feminine given name. The meaning differs based on the hanja used to write each syllable of the name. There are 54 hanja with the reading "seo" and 20 hanja with the reading "yoon" on the South Korean government's official list of hanja which may be registered for use in given names. Seo-yun was the 1st-most popular name for baby girls in South Korea in 2015, 2nd-most popular name in 2013 and 2017, and it was among the top 5 most popular name for newborn girls in 2008, 2009 and 2011.

See also
List of Korean given names

References

Korean unisex given names